Le Vernet-Chaméane (Auvergnat: Le Vernet e Chameana) is a commune in the Puy-de-Dôme department in Auvergne in central France. It was established on 1 January 2019 by merger of the former communes of Vernet-la-Varenne (the seat) and Chaméane.

See also
Communes of the Puy-de-Dôme department

References

Vernetchameane